The Cavalier Athletic Conference is a high school athletic conference composed primarily of schools in Virginia.

Members
Blue Ridge School
Fredericksburg Academy
Highland School
Massanutten Military Academy
Quantico High School
Randolph-Macon Academy
Shenandoah Valley Academy
Tandem Friends School
Wakefield Country Day School
Wakefield School

References

High school sports conferences and leagues in the United States